The Perfect Candidate is a 2019 Saudi Arabian drama film directed by Haifaa al-Mansour. It was selected to compete for the Golden Lion at the 76th Venice International Film Festival. It was also selected as the Saudi Arabian entry for the Best International Feature Film at the 92nd Academy Awards, but it was not nominated.

Plot
A young female Saudi doctor's run for office in the local city elections forces her family and community to accept their town's first female candidate.

Cast
 Mila Al Zahrani as Maryam
 Nora Al Awadh as Sara
 Dhay as Selma

Reception
The website's critics consensus reads: "A message movie admirable for its subtlety as well as its execution, The Perfect Candidate faces oppression and powerfully advocates for change." On Metacritic, the film has a weighted average score of 70 out of 100, based on 14 critics, indicating "generally favorable reviews".

Writing for The Hollywood Reporter, Deborah Young called the film a "simplistic feminist tale with an irresistible heroine" and said: "The Perfect Candidate offers a candid view on Saudi Arabian society that will pique the curiosity of Western audiences."

Awards

 Brian Award at the 76th Venice International Film Festival

See also
 List of submissions to the 92nd Academy Awards for Best International Feature Film
 List of Saudi Arabian submissions for the Academy Award for Best International Feature Film
Elections in Saudi Arabia

References

External links
 

2019 films
2019 drama films
2010s Arabic-language films
2010s feminist films
Saudi Arabian drama films
Films directed by Haifaa al-Mansour
Political drama films